Bald Knob is an unincorporated community in Boone County, West Virginia, United States. Bald Knob had a post office, which closed on October 1, 2005. The community took its name from nearby Bald Knob peak.

References

Unincorporated communities in Boone County, West Virginia